The valley of Punial (Urdu: پونیال) is situated in Ghizer District in the Gilgit-Baltistan, Pakistan, where hundreds of thousands of tourists visit annually. Punial is a mountainous valley situated at an elevation of about 5000–9000 feet. It has pleasant weather and a hospitable populace.

Villages of Punial Valley 
Gulapur, Sher Qillah, Dalnati, Hamuchal, Gohar Abad (Gutmsas), Japukay, Gitch, Dass Japukay, Singal(Heart of Punial), Thingdass, Gulmuti, Buber (Bubur, Minipunial), Gurunjur, Gahkuch bala, Gahkuch pine, Silpi, Damas, Ayshi, Golo Dass, Hatoon, Hasis, Haim, Birgal, Famani and Hopper.
Gohar Abad, Gitch,and Thingdass are mainly part of larger Singal.

History
The word “Punial” is from the Shina language. It has two meanings: “fertile land” and “bucket of fruits”.
Punial is related to neighbour areas of Gilgit agency. Punially people belonged to Arian “Mazdaism” ( آتش پرست ), Shina language penetrated in the area. The area were Hindus in Punial. After Dardistan a great civilization namely Indo-Aryans established in Gilgit Baltistan. The whole population of Punial became Buddhist.
Before recent past occupation of Punially rajas there were tribal heads system. Some rulers ruled on Punial like shout and other tribal heads of different tribes.
Earlier, the Brush family from Chitral have ruled the region and it becomes a separate independent state. First Mehtar of Katur Dynasty was Sifat Bahadur and set Gahkuch as capital.
Punial covered area from Biyarchi to Hoper and up to Birgal.

Raja Nasir ul Din of puniyal

Raja Nasir ul Din alias Jan Alam grandson of Esa Bahdur and the last ruler of Katur Dynasty in Punial. 
Jan Alam sustained two out of three uprisings against the autocratic rule by people of Punial. 
The first uprising was in 1895 which resulted in the First Constitution (Dastoor ul amal ) of Punial in 1898 by Raj. 
The second uprising was instigated by father of Jan Alam (Raja Anwar Khan) the ruler himself to contain his cousin Khan Bahdur by depriving him of the privileges given in the first dastoor ul amal in 1935. This uprising resulted in amendments in the first dastoor and abolished various categories of people like Darkkhan, Raihat and gushpur etc. 
The third uprising in 1951 was initiated by Syeds (father and uncle of Pir Karam Ali Shah). The uprising suppressed for the time being, but it was converted into a movement and spread over to other regions like Nagar and resulted into end of autocratic rule in 1971 by Bhutto as part of his nationwide reforms by abolishing the princely states.

Gahkuch

Gahkuch is the main town, and the district headquarters. It is a popular tourist attraction in the region because of the spectacular surrounding scenery. 

Sher Qilla is another large village in the Punial valley.  The distance is 40 km and time required to reach there is about 45 min to 1 hour.

See also
 Punial State

References

Ghizer District